Lauhachinda's cave gecko (Gekko lauhachindai) is an endangered species of lizard in the family Gekkonidae. The species is endemic to Thailand.

Etymology
The specific name, lauhachindai, is in honor of Thai herpetologist Virayuth Lauhachinda.

Geographic range
G. lauhachindai is found in central Thailand.

Description
In life, the iris of the eye may be entirely coppery brown, or it may be greenish gray with coppery brown around the margins of the pupil.

Habitat
The preferred natural habitat of G. lauhachindai is dry caves.

References

Further reading
Panitvong N, Sumontha M, Konlek K, Kunya K (2010). "Gekko lauhachindai sp. nov., a new cave-dwelling gecko (Reptilia: Gekkonidae) from central Thailand". Zootaxa 2671: 40–52. (Gekko lauhachindai, new species).

Gekko
Reptiles described in 2010
Geckos of Thailand
Endemic fauna of Thailand